Looking for Ms. Locklear is a 2008 American documentary film written, produced, composed, edited, and directed by Rhett McLaughlin and Link Neal. The film follows two best friends as they set out on a journey to discover the whereabouts of their first grade teacher, Lenora Locklear.

The film was released by RhettandLinKreations on July 23, 2008.

Premise

Production 
The film was shot in parts of Buies Creek, North Carolina and Washington, District of Columbia, United States.

Release 
The film was released online through RhettandLinKreations on July 23, 2008. The film was additionally screened by the Southern Culture Movie Series in 2016.

References

External links 

 

2008 films
2008 documentary films
American documentary films
2000s English-language films
2000s American films